Jack Cakebread (1929 – April 26, 2022) was an American winemaker. He founded Cakebread Cellars in 1973.

References

1929 births
2022 deaths
American winemakers
People from Napa County, California